John Chaplin may refer to:
John Chaplin (coach), American track and field athlete and coach
Jack Chaplin (1882–1951), Scottish association football coach
Sir John Chaplin (died 1730), of the Chaplin baronets
John Worthy Chaplin (1840–1920), English recipient of the Victoria Cross

See also
Chaplin (surname)